Preciado Bakish (Hebrew: פרסיאדו בקיש ) was a rabbi and a Bulgar member of the Zionist Movement.

Biographical elements
Born in 1828 at Sofia (Bulgaria) to a Sephardic Jewish family. He died in Jerusalem at the age of 82 (1910). He was named Chief Rabbi of Bulgaria (1885–1889; 1895–1898  or 1900) and Av Beit Din (Chairman of the Rabbinical Court) He participated in the First Zionist Congress<ref>Z. Loker, "The Sephardic Jews in Bulgaria", in H. Mechoulan (ed. 1992), Les Juifs d'Espagne histoire d'une diaspora. 1492-1992', p. 260. However, some sources do not mention its participation (http://www.jewishvirtuallibrary.org/jsource/vjw/bulgaria.html)</ref> held on 29, 30 and 31 August 1897 to Basel (Switzerland) along with three other delegates from Bulgaria (Zvi Belkovsky, Karl Herbst, Yehoshua Kalef) and some 200 other members from around the world. These activities have created difficulties and Rabbi Preciado Bakish was not maintained in his functions as Chief Rabbi of Bulgaria after 1900.  A photograph of Rabbi Bakish was published on a genealogy website

Notes

References

Bibliography
 Anon (2002), 'List of the most famous Jews in Bulgaria during the period 1900-2000', SEGA (СЕГА) n° 5492 (2002), http://www.segabg.com/article.php?id=56802
 Benjamin Arditti (Ed. 1969), Vidni Evrei. Famous Jews of Bulgaria, Volume I, pp. 20–32, Tel Aviv
 Hillel Bakis (1992), 'Rabbi Ichaya Bakish. Un rabbin-juge marocain (16e-17e siècles)', pp. 1–40 (Préciado Bakich is quoted p. 4), in I. Bakish, Fragments, 132 p., Editions Bakish, Kiryat Ata
 Ivanka Gezenko (2014), ‘ЕВРЕЙСКАТА ОБЩНОСТ В БЪЛГАРИЯ 1879-1947 Г', p. 7, in Les Juifs en Bulgarie et dans les territoires sous administration bulgare pendant l’Holocauste. Colloque organisé dans le cadre du programme du Conseil de l’Europe « Transmission de la mémoire de l’Holocauste et prévention des crimes contre l’humanité », 26 mai, The Red House, Sofia. 39 p.
 Ivanka Gezenko (2015), ‘Political changes in Central Jewish Religious in Bulgaria (Sept. Dec. 1944)‘ pp. 205–211 (see p. 206), in Scientific Conference: "70 years since the coup of 1944 - Background and consequences. Collection of research, Central Military Club, Sofia. 8 sept. 2014. Manta print, Sofia. http://www.anamnesis.info/sites/default/files/SbornikDokladi.pdf 
  Joseph J. Levy, Josué Elkouby & Marc Eliany (2001), Dictionnaire biographique du monde Juif sépharade et méditerranéen, Editions Elysée, Côte-St-Luc, Québec, 338 p. (p. 28).         
 Henry Mechoulan (Dir. 1992), Les Juifs d'Espagne histoire d'une diaspora 1492-1992, Paris, Liana Lévi, see the following chapter : Zvi Loker (1992),Les Juifs séfarades de Bulgarie''. 
 Mathilde Tagger & S. Alfassa Marks (2004 ?),’’Bulgaria Chief Rabbis’’, Fondation for the Advancement of Sephardic Studies and Culture, http://www.sephardicstudies.org/bulg-rab.html.

External links
 http://www.sephardichouse.org/prom_bulg_jews.pdf.
 http://www.geni.com/people/% (fiche contenant une photographie).
 http://www.jewishvirtuallibrary.org/jsource/vjw/bulgaria.html.
 http://skachate.ru/jurnalistika/63296/index.html?page=12

1828 births
1910 deaths
Bulgarian rabbis
Bulgarian Sephardi Jews
Jewish Bulgarian history
Clergy from Sofia
Bulgarian Zionists
Sephardi rabbis